LIM and senescent cell antigen-like-containing domain protein 1 is a protein that in humans is encoded by the LIMS1 gene.

Function 

The protein encoded by this gene is an adaptor protein which contains five LIM domains, or double zinc fingers. The protein is likely involved in integrin signaling through its LIM domain-mediated interaction with integrin-linked kinase, found in focal adhesion plaques. It is also thought to act as a bridge linking integrin-linked kinase to NCK adaptor protein 2, which is involved in growth factor receptor kinase signaling pathways. Its localization to the periphery of spreading cells also suggests that this protein may play a role in integrin-mediated cell adhesion or spreading.

Interactions 

LIMS1 has been shown to interact with Integrin-linked kinase and NCK2.

References

Further reading